Gothel may refer to:

 Dame Gothel, a fictional character from the German fairy tale "Rapunzel"
 Mother Gothel, a fictional character who appears Disney animated film Tangled

See also
Goethel, a German surname